Johannes Augustinus Petrus "Jan" Tops (born 5 April 1961) is an equestrian from the Netherlands, who won the gold medal in the team jumping event at the 1992 Summer Olympics in Barcelona, Spain riding Top Gun. He did so alongside Piet Raijmakers, Jos Lansink and Bert Romp. He competed in four consecutive Summer Olympics for his native country, starting in 1988.

Jan Tops initiated the Global Champions Tour in 2006. The equestrian sport was in need of a positive impulse, and by founding this world class renown tour, the media attention was increased as well as the prize money.

Presenting sponsors CN and CN WorldWide have been with the GCT since the beginning, as well as media partner Eurosport who broadcasts the Global Champions Tour legs in 59 countries. Rolex has become the official timepiece since 2008.

The legs of 2008 took place in Doha (QAT), Hamburg (GER), Cannes (FRA), Monte-Carlo (MON), Estoril (POR), Valkenswaard (NED), Arezzo (ITA), and São Paulo (BRA).

Tops was born in Valkenswaard. He married Australian-born Edwina Alexander in September 2011.

References 
 Dutch Olympic Committee 

1961 births
Living people
Dutch show jumping riders
Olympic equestrians of the Netherlands
Dutch male equestrians
Equestrians at the 1988 Summer Olympics
Equestrians at the 1992 Summer Olympics
Equestrians at the 1996 Summer Olympics
Equestrians at the 2000 Summer Olympics
Olympic gold medalists for the Netherlands
People from Valkenswaard
Olympic medalists in equestrian
Medalists at the 1992 Summer Olympics
Horse trader
Sportspeople from North Brabant